Teeth Tracks is a painting by Ellen Gallagher. It is in the collection of The Broad in Los Angeles in the United States.

The painting is a series of multi-colored oil and pencil drawings of what appear to be teeth marks or teeth charts from a dental office or laboratory. Each image is drawn on a piece of paper which is then adhered to a canvas. 

The painting was acquired by The Broad on November 7, 1996. The painting was featured in the exhibition Creature held at The Broad from November 5 to March 19 2016.

References

1996 paintings
Paintings by Ellen Gallagher